Charles F. Payne (born December 22, 1964) is an American politician who has served in the Georgia State Senate from the 54th district since 2017. Senator Chuck Payne, a Republican, was first elected
to serve as the State Senator for the 54th district in January 2017. Senator Payne serves as Vice Chairman of the Senate State and Local Governmental Operations Committee, Ex-Officio of the Senate Public Safety Committee, Secretary of the Senate Finance Committee, Secretary of the Senate Higher Education Committee and Secretary of the Senate State Institutions and Property Committee. Senator
Payne also serves as Chairman of the Senate Finance Sub-Committee on issues pertaining to Ad Valorem Taxes.

Sen. Payne served four years (1984-1988) in the Army and the 82nd Airborne Division at Fort Bragg, NC. It was during this time that he met the love of his life, Angie Sellers, and they were married in January 1988. In that same year, they moved back to Dalton and Sen. Payne began his 30-year career of public service to troubled youth and their families with the Georgia Department of Juvenile Justice. Sen. Payne retired from the Department of Juvenile Justice with 30 years of service on October 31, 2016.

Sen. Payne has always maintained his affinity for working with youth. In his 30 years with the Department of Juvenile Justice, he helped a countless number of kids who found themselves on the wrong side of the law, and many give him credit for helping to turn their lives around. Sen. Payne has volunteered to coach little league sports for both boys and girls, having coached basketball, softball, baseball and
football over the course of many years.

Sen. Payne has also been very involved in civic efforts over the past 28 years. He has served as Chairman of the Whitfield County Republican Party of Georgia throughout the years of 1997-2005 and 2013-2016. He was also elected among his peers to serve as Vice-Chair of both the GA-9th Congressional District Republican Party (2009) and the GA-14th District Republican Party (2010-2013). Throughout his 28 years of volunteer effort, “principle above politics” has remained the focus of his efforts in building consensus of conservative
ideals and principle across North Georgia, devoting the balance of his time to his family and services of his faith.

Sen. Payne and his wife, Angie, have two children – son, Chaz Payne and daughter, Heather Johnson and son in-law, Daniel Johnson. In March 2019, their family welcomed the birth of their first grandchild.

References

1964 births
Living people
Republican Party Georgia (U.S. state) state senators
21st-century American politicians